Fatoumata Baldé (born March 7, 1993, in Kamsar) is a Guinean association football player who plays for her country's national women's team and currently plays for US Orléans in the Division 2 Feminine.

Career 
The daughter of former vice president of the Guinean Football Federation Alpha Tata Baldé, Fatoumata Baldé was born in the Guinean port city of Kamsar on March 7, 1993, where she played active soccer and tennis. She started a career with DH Atlantique, joining them at the beginning of the 2008/2009 season and then Rezé Football Club in France. In their first season they won the regional division league and she was named the best player in her team. At the beginning of the 2010/2011 season, she announced her departure from FC Rezé to play the French championship by signing up with ESOF La Roche-sur-Yon.

Fatoumata Baldé made an appearance on September 5, 2010, when she came on as a substitute for Nathalie Serot against ASJ Soyaux for La Roche. They came in the second highest on the league table.

In the summer of 2012 she moved completely into the first squad of her team and scored five goals for La Roche-sur-Yon in ten games. In the summer of 2013, she joined En Avant de Guingamp.

References

1993 births
Living people
Division 1 Féminine players
En Avant Guingamp (women) players
Guinean women's footballers
Women's association football forwards
Dijon FCO (women) players